Jutta of Denmark also known as Judith (1246-1286/95) was a daughter of Eric IV of Denmark and his wife Jutta of Saxony. She was a younger sister of Queen Sophia of Sweden, and Queen Ingeborg of Norway, as well as an older sister of Agnes. Jutta was also mistress for a brief period of time to her brother-in-law Valdemar, King of Sweden. Jutta was a member of the House of Estridsen.

Life
In 1250, when Jutta was around four years old, her father was murdered. Her mother remarried to Burgrave Burchard VIII of Magdeburg. Her two eldest sisters Sophia and Ingeborg were soon married off, while Jutta and her sister Agnes were placed in St. Agnes' Priory, Roskilde. Neither Jutta or Agnes could find pleasure in the tough and lonely monastic life.

In 1269, her sister queen Sophia of Sweden stopped at their father's grave in Denmark on a visit to her sisters, Agnes and Jutta in Roskilde. In 1272, Jutta journeyed to Sweden where she became the mistress to her brother-in-law, Valdemar. The affair resulted in a child who was born in 1273. The boy was named Erik although, some  dispute this. The following year, Jutta was again placed in the convent of St. Agneta, and Valdemar was forced to make a pilgrimage to Rome to ask for the Pope's absolution. According to legend, Queen Sophia said: I will never recover from this sorrow. Curse the day my sister saw the kingdom of Sweden Sophia and Valdemar later separated.

Jutta remained in the convent for the rest of her life. Eric V of Denmark (Jutta's cousin) denied Jutta and Agnes their rightful inheritance from their father; this, however, was settled in 1284 when the sisters received their inheritance. Judith died sometime between 1286 and 1295. Around the same time, Agnes supposedly married her cousin Eric Longbone, Lord of Langeland. Sophia died in 1286.

Ancestry

References

1246 births
1280s deaths
1290s deaths
Mistresses of Swedish royalty
House of Estridsen
Danish princesses
13th-century Danish women
13th-century Danish landowners
13th-century Danish women landowners
13th-century women landowners
13th-century Danish people
13th-century Swedish people
13th-century Swedish women
Danish abbesses
Daughters of kings